Geometry Wars is a video game made by Bizarre Creations. Initially a minigame in  Project Gotham Racing 2, an updated version, titled Retro Evolved, was eventually released for the Xbox 360. That version, at one point, held the record for the most downloaded Xbox Live Arcade Game.

Retro Evolved was later included in the 2007 game Geometry Wars: Galaxies, the first game in the series to be released for non-Microsoft platforms.

Gameplay 
The object of Geometry Wars is to survive as long as possible and score as many points as possible by destroying an ever-increasing swarm of enemies. The game takes place on a rectangular playfield and the player controls a claw-shaped "ship" that can move in any direction using the left thumbstick, and can fire in any direction independently using the right thumbstick. The player also has a limited number of bombs that can be detonated and destroy all enemies on the playfield. As the game progresses, the player can earn extra lives and additional bombs at set score increments, and the primary weapon changes at regular intervals (10,000 points). Also, enemies spawn in progressively larger quantities and at greater frequency as the game progresses. If an enemy touches the player's ship, the ship explodes and a life is lost, plus the multiplier worked up by how many enemies are killed in one life is also lost. The game is over when the player runs out of lives.

The Evolved version of the game takes place on a playfield that is slightly larger than the display area of the TV screen, and the camera follows the player's movements. A background grid pattern adds to the graphical effects by warping in reaction to player shots and the behavior of certain enemies. This version introduces new enemies and a score multiplier that increases as the player destroys enemies without losing a life.

Development 
The game initially started out as a way for the team at Bizarre Creations to test out the Xbox controller while making Project Gotham Racing. The team included the game as an extra in the sequel not expecting very much. When the creators realized how popular the game was they decided to work on a stand-alone game for the 360's Live Arcade. For the standalone version, which eventually grew to become Retro Evolved, creator Stephen Cakebread initially wanted to make the game have a more linear structure where the players would progress through levels. However, Cakebread soon became aware of the game Mutant Storm and realized that a level-based structure would make Retro Evolved almost identical and thus decided to drop it.

The soundtrack was composed by Chris Chudley from Audioantics who created the music for all of the series up until Dimensions.

Reception 

Geometry Wars: Retro Evolved received positive reviews from critics. On Metacritic, the game holds scores of 76/100 for the PC version based on 7 reviews and 86/100 for the Xbox 360 version based on 26 reviews.

GameSpot's Carrie Gouskos rated the Xbox 360 version of the game 8.2/10, praising the gameplay, graphics, controls, sound effects, and its low launch price (400 Microsoft Points or $5 USD). The PC version, reviewed by Jeff Gerstmann, received a lower score at 6.7/10 due to its gameplay being unsuitable for mouse and keyboard, lack of leaderboards, excluding the "Retro" mode featured in the Xbox 360 version, and having a higher launch price ($7.95 USD) on top of everything else.

Sequels 
The success of the game inspired multiple sequels: Geometry Wars: Retro Evolved 2 and Geometry Wars 3: Dimensions, as well as a spin-off titled Geometry Wars: Galaxies.

See also 
 GridWars, a freeware Geometry Wars clone for PC

References 

2003 video games
Bizarre Creations games
Geometry Wars
Microsoft games
Single-player video games
Multidirectional shooters
Video games developed in the United Kingdom
Windows games
Xbox 360 Live Arcade games
Xbox games